Ivan Ognyanov Yanchev (born 20 March 1988) is a Bulgarian footballer who currently plays as a striker for Marek.

References

External links 
 

1988 births
Living people
Bulgarian footballers
First Professional Football League (Bulgaria) players
FC Montana players
PFC Beroe Stara Zagora players
PFC Nesebar players
PFC Marek Dupnitsa players
PFC Akademik Svishtov players
Association football forwards